In modal logic, Sahlqvist formulas are a certain kind of modal formula with remarkable properties. The Sahlqvist correspondence theorem states that every Sahlqvist formula is canonical, and corresponds to a first-order definable class of Kripke frames. 

Sahlqvist's definition characterizes a decidable set of modal formulas with first-order correspondents. Since it is undecidable, by Chagrova's theorem, whether an arbitrary modal formula has a first-order correspondent, there are formulas with first-order frame conditions that are not Sahlqvist [Chagrova 1991] (see the examples below). Hence Sahlqvist formulas define only a (decidable) subset of modal formulas with first-order correspondents.

Definition 
Sahlqvist formulas are built up from implications, where the consequent is positive and the antecedent is of a restricted form.
 A Sahlqvist implication is a formula A → B, where A is a Sahlqvist antecedent, and B is a positive formula.

Examples of Sahlqvist formulas 
 
 
  or 
  or 
 
 

Examples of non-Sahlqvist formulas
 
 This is the McKinsey formula; it does not have a first-order frame condition.
  
 The Löb axiom is not Sahlqvist; again, it does not have a first-order frame condition.
 
 The conjunction of the McKinsey formula and the (4) axiom has a first-order frame condition (the conjunction of the transitivity property with the property ) but is not equivalent to any Sahlqvist formula.

Kracht's theorem 
When a Sahlqvist formula is used as an axiom in a normal modal logic, the logic is guaranteed to be complete with respect to the elementary class of frames the axiom defines. This result comes from the Sahlqvist completeness theorem [Modal Logic, Blackburn et al., Theorem 4.42]. But there is also a converse theorem, namely a theorem that states which first-order conditions are the correspondents of Sahlqvist formulas. Kracht's theorem states that any Sahlqvist formula locally corresponds to a Kracht formula; and conversely, every Kracht formula is a local first-order correspondent of some Sahlqvist formula which can be effectively obtained from the Kracht formula [Modal Logic, Blackburn et al., Theorem 3.59].

References

 L. A. Chagrova, 1991.  An undecidable problem in correspondence theory.  Journal of Symbolic Logic 56:1261–1272.
 Marcus Kracht, 1993.  How completeness and correspondence theory got married.  In de Rijke, editor, Diamonds and Defaults, pages 175–214.  Kluwer.
 Henrik Sahlqvist, 1975.  Correspondence and completeness in the first- and second-order semantics for modal logic.  In Proceedings of the Third Scandinavian Logic Symposium.  North-Holland, Amsterdam.

Modal logic